Madiba is a three-part American biographical drama television miniseries documenting the true lifelong struggle of Xhosa human rights activist, lawyer, political prisoner, and eventual president of South Africa Nelson Mandela to overthrow the oppressive regime of institutionalized racism and segregation known as apartheid. The series stars Laurence Fishburne, Orlando Jones, David Harewood, Michael Nyqvist, Terry Pheto, Jason Kennett and Kate Liquorish. The three-part miniseries made its debut on BET on February 1, 2017, concluding on February 15, 2017.

While the miniseries is named for and largely follows the story of Madiba (Nelson Mandela), Laurence Fishburne has stated that one of the primary intentions of the miniseries was to highlight the important role played by Mandela's many family members, friends, and colleagues at the ANC who worked tirelessly alongside him to successfully overthrow the regime of apartheid.

Cast 
Laurence Fishburne as Nelson Mandela
Orlando Jones as Oliver Tambo 
David Harewood as Walter Sisulu
Michael Nyqvist as Hendrik Verwoerd
Terry Pheto as Winnie Madikizela-Mandela
Jason Kennett as Joe Slovo
Kate Liquorish as Ruth First
Hlomla Dandala as Govan Mbeki
Meren Reddy as Ahmed Kathrada
Kajal Bagwandeen as Amina Cachalia
James Gracie as Hendrik van den Bergh
Armand Aucamp as Warder Prinsloo
Garth Breytenbach as Warder Brand
Mark Elderkin as Trevor Huddleston
Grant Swanby as Bram Fischer
Sello Maake Ka-Ncube as Chief Albert Luthuli

Episodes

Production
Principal photography began on April 4, 2016, and took place in Cape Town, Johannesburg, and Robben Island, South Africa.

References

External links

Official Site at BET.com

2010s American drama television miniseries
2017 American television series debuts
2017 American television series endings
Apartheid in fiction
BET original programming
Cultural depictions of Nelson Mandela
Television shows directed by Kevin Hooks
Television shows filmed in South Africa
Television shows set in South Africa